Richard Jeffrey Danzig (born September 8, 1944) is an American politician and lawyer who served as the 71st Secretary of the Navy under President Bill Clinton. He served as an advisor of the President Barack Obama during his presidential campaign and was later the chairman of the national security think-tank, the Center for a New American Security.

Early life and education
Danzig was born in New York City in 1944, and attended the Bronx High School of Science, graduating in 1961.  He received a B.A. degree in 1965 from Reed College, a J.D. degree in 1971 from Yale Law School, and a Bachelor of Philosophy degree in 1967 and a Doctor of Philosophy degree in 1968 from Magdalen College at Oxford University, where he was a Rhodes Scholar. Upon his graduation from law school, he served as a law clerk to United States Supreme Court Justice Byron White.

Professorship
Between 1972 and 1977, Danzig taught contract law at Stanford and Harvard Universities. He was awarded a Prize Fellowship of the Harvard Society of Fellows, and a Rockefeller Foundation Fellowship. From 1977 to 1981, he served in the Office of the Secretary of Defense (OSD), first as a Deputy Assistant Secretary and then as the Principal Deputy Assistant Secretary of Defense for Manpower, Reserve Affairs and Logistics.  In 1981, he was awarded the Defense Distinguished Public Service Award.

Washington, D.C. years
Between 1977 and 1981, Danzig served as a Deputy Assistant Secretary of Defense and then as Principal Deputy Assistant Secretary for Manpower, Reserve Affairs, and Logistics.

From 1981 to 1993, Danzig was a partner in the Washington, D.C., office of the international law firm Latham & Watkins. He served as deputy chair of the firm's International Practice Group, and also as director of its Japan Group. He was also a director of the National Semiconductor Corporation, a trustee of Reed College, and interim director of litigation and then vice chairman of the International Human Rights Law Group. During this time, Danzig was co-author, with the distinguished policy analyst Peter Szanton, of the book, National Service: What Would It Mean? A decade before, Szanton had been head of the New York City-RAND Institute, a joint venture of the City and the RAND Corporation when Danzig came to that office as a law student.  The book which Danzig and Szanton co-authored helped shape America's current civilian National Service system.

Danzig served as the Under Secretary of the Navy from November 1993 to May 1997.  In 1994, Danzig was elected as a fellow in the National Academy of Public Administration. Later he was sworn in as the 71st Secretary of the Navy on November 16, 1998.  In the period between these two jobs, he and his wife, Andrea, lived in Asia and Europe while Danzig served as a Traveling Fellow of the Center for International Political Economy and as an adjunct professor at Syracuse University's Maxwell School of Citizenship and Public Affairs.

Later career
In 2007 and 2008, Danzig worked for Senator Obama's campaign as an advisor on national security issues.

Danzig has been a director of National Semiconductor Corporation and Human Genome Sciences Corporation.

In 2014, Danzig delivered the fifth Sloan Foundation Cyber Security Lecture at the NYU Polytechnic School of Engineering, based on his publication "Surviving on a Diet of Poisoned Fruit: Reducing the National Security Risks of America's Cyber Dependencies".

He is currently chairman of the board of directors of the Center for a New American Security, an independent think tank. He is also a member of the Defense Policy Board, a federal advisory committee to the United States Department of Defense, and is a senior fellow at the Johns Hopkins University Applied Physics Laboratory. Danzig also served as a member of the Homeland Security Advisory Council. but resigned on July 18, 2018 over immigration decisions to separate families.

Awards and honors

Personal life
Danzig and his wife Andrea live in Washington, D.C., and have two adult children, David and Lisa.

See also 
 List of law clerks of the Supreme Court of the United States (Seat 6)

References

External links
Official Navy biography
Biography at ourpublicservice.org
Center for a New American Security Biography

|-

1944 births
Alumni of Magdalen College, Oxford
American Rhodes Scholars
Clinton administration personnel
Harvard University faculty
Law clerks of the Supreme Court of the United States
Lawyers from New York City
Living people
People associated with Latham & Watkins
Politicians from New York City
Reed College alumni
Stanford Law School faculty
The Bronx High School of Science alumni
United States Under Secretaries of the Navy
United States Secretaries of the Navy
Washington, D.C., Democrats
Yale Law School alumni